Baker Township is a township in Randolph County, Arkansas, United States. Its total population was 55 as of the 2010 United States Census, an increase of 1.85 percent from 54 at the 2000 census.

According to the 2010 Census, Baker Township is located at  (36.462305, -91.134313).

References

External links 

Townships in Arkansas
Populated places in Randolph County, Arkansas